The 1980–81 Minnesota North Stars season was the North Stars' 14th season. Although the North Stars finished the season with one less win and one less point than the previous year, they made a surprise appearance in the Stanley Cup Finals against the New York Islanders, which they lost 4 games to 1.

Offseason

NHL Draft

Regular season

Season standings

Schedule and results

Player statistics

Skaters
Note: GP = Games played; G = Goals; A = Assists; Pts = Points; PIM = Penalty minutes

Goaltending
Note: GP = Games played; W = Wins; L = Losses; T = Ties; SO = Shutouts; GAA = Goals against average

Playoffs

Stanley Cup Finals
New York Islanders vs. Minnesota North Stars

New York wins the series 4–1.

Awards and records

References
 North Stars on Hockey Database

Minnesota North Stars seasons
Minnesota North Stars
Minnesota North Stars
Minn
Minnesota Twins
Minnesota Twins